Reza Sayed Badiyi (also known as Reza Badiei; Persian: رضا بدیعی; April 17, 1930 – August 20, 2011) was an Iranian-born American film and television director. His credits also include developing the opening montages for Mission: Impossible, Hawaii Five-O, Get Smart, and The Mary Tyler Moore Show.

Early life and education
Badiyi was born April 17, 1930, in Arak, Pahlavi Iran. His parents were from Isfahan, Iran. He graduated from the Academy of Drama in Iran. He worked with the Audio Visual Department in Tehran, (Honarhayeh Zeeba), and completed 24 documentary films, prior to leaving the country.

Badiyi moved to the United States in 1955, in order to continue his film studies at Syracuse University. He was invited by the United States Department of State to continue his studies in America after winning an international film award for Flood in Khuzestan. He graduated from Syracuse University with a degree in filmmaking.

Career
Badiyi moved to Kansas to work for Calvin Co., an industrial film production company. Badiyi often worked with Robert Altman. Badiyi was assistant director on the low-budget 1957 film The Delinquents, which marked Altman's feature film debut as a director and the cult classic horror film Carnival of Souls, made in 1962.

Early in his career, he directed episodes of Get Smart, Mission: Impossible, Hawaii Five-O, The Incredible Hulk, Mannix, The Six Million Dollar Man, Starsky and Hutch, The Rockford Files and Police Squad!. He also directed the definitive "fashion show" sequence of the third season of the popular Doris Day Show. Perhaps his most famous work was crafting the title visualisation (i.e., the opening and closing credits) for the original Hawaii Five-O. There were lowlights, as well, including directing the unsold pilot for Inside O.U.T., starring up-and-coming actress Farrah Fawcett and a chimp for Screen Gems in 1971.

In the 1980s and 1990s, he directed episodes of Falcon Crest, Cagney and Lacey, Dr. Quinn, Medicine Woman, Star Trek: Deep Space Nine, Buffy the Vampire Slayer, La Femme Nikita, Sliders and Baywatch and Early Edition.

Badiyi set a Directors Guild of America record for directing the most hours of episodic series television ever.

Awards
In the mid-1970s he received the Golden Ribbon of Art award from the reigning Shah of Iran. He later won various awards, including the Humanitas Prize for an episode of Cagney and Lacey. He was honored by the Directors Guild of America for directing over 400 hours of television. In May 2010, Badiyi was honored at UCLA for his 80th birthday and his 60th year in the entertainment industry. In 2009, he was honored with a Lifetime Achievement Award at the Noor Iranian Film Festival in Los Angeles, and after his passing in 2011, the festival made the award his namesake.

Personal life
He was the father of three children which included Mina, Alexis and Natasha.

Badiyi's third and last marriage was to actress Tania Harley from 1987 until his death in 2011, with whom he had two daughters, Alexis and Natasha. His second marriage was to actress and writer Barbara Turner; with whom he had one daughter, Mina. By this marriage to Turner he was the stepfather of actress Jennifer Jason Leigh and Carrie Morrow. His first marriage was to Gwendolyn Davis which ended in divorce.

Death
Badiyi died in Los Angeles, California on August 20, 2011, at the age of 81, having struggled with various health issues.

Filmography

Director 
This is list showing a selection of entertainment directed by Reza Badiyi, in order by start date. He directed more than 430 television episodes from 1963 onward.

 2006 – The Way Back Home
 2003 – She Spies 
 1999 – Early Edition 
 1999–1998 – Sliders 
 1999–1998 – Mortal Kombat: Conquest 
 1997 – La Femme Nikita (TV series) 
 1997 – Buffy the Vampire Slayer 
 1997 – The Cape 
 1996 – Baywatch 
 1994–1996 – Star Trek: Deep Space Nine 
 1992–1994 – In the Heat of the Night 
 1985–1986 – T. J. Hooker 
 1982–1988 – Cagney & Lacey 
 1982-1984 – Joe Dancer 
 1978–1980 – The Incredible Hulk 
 1977–1979 – The Rockford Files 
 1976–1978 – Baretta 
 1974 – The Six Million Dollar Man
 1970–1971 – The Doris Day Show
 1969–1979 – Hawaii Five-O 
 1969–1972 – Mission: Impossible
 1969 – The Good Guys

References

External links
 
 
 OCPC Magazine Cover story: Reza Badiei - The last TV tycoon
 Veteran TV director Reza Badiei feted

1930 births
2011 deaths
American film directors
American television directors
Iranian emigrants to the United States
Syracuse University alumni
People from Arak, Iran